Oracle Applications comprise the applications software or business software of the Oracle Corporation both in the cloud and on-premises. The term refers to the non-database and non-middleware parts. The suite of applications includes enterprise resource planning, enterprise performance management, supply chain & manufacturing, human capital management, and advertising and customer experience.

Oracle initially launched its application suite with financials software in the late 1980s. By 2009, the offering extended to supply chain management, human-resource management, warehouse-management, customer-relationship management, call-center services, product-lifecycle management, and many other areas. Both in-house expansion and the acquisition of other companies have vastly expanded Oracle's application software business.

In February 2007, Oracle released Oracle E-Business Suite (EBS/e-BS) Release 12 (R12)a bundling of several Oracle Applications. The release date coincided with new releases of other Oracle-owned products: JD Edwards EnterpriseOne, Siebel Systems and PeopleSoft.

Oracle also has a portfolio of enterprise applications for the cloud (SaaS) known as Oracle Fusion Cloud Applications. These cloud applications include Oracle Cloud ERP, Oracle Cloud EPM, Oracle Cloud HCM, Oracle Cloud SCM, and Oracle Advertising and CX.

Cloud applications 

Oracle provides SaaS applications also known as Oracle Fusion Cloud Applications. The following enterprise cloud applications are available on Oracle Cloud.

 Oracle Enterprise Resource Planning (ERP) Cloud
 Oracle Enterprise Performance Management (EPM) Cloud
 Oracle Human Capital Management (HCM) Cloud
 Oracle Supply Chain Management (SCM) Cloud
 Oracle Advertising and Customer Experience (CX) Cloud

Oracle Enterprise Resource Planning (ERP) 
Oracle Cloud ERP is a cloud-based ERP software application suite that manages enterprise functions including accounting, financial management, project management, and procurement.

Oracle Enterprise Performance Management (EPM) 
Oracle Cloud EPM is a cloud-based EPM software application suite that manages enterprise operational processes including planning, budgeting, and reporting.

Oracle Human Capital Management (HCM) 
Oracle Cloud HCM is a cloud-based HCM software application suite that manages global HR, talent, and workforce management. Oracle Cloud HCM was released in 2011 as a part of Oracle Fusion Applications.

Oracle Supply Chain Management (SCM) 

Oracle Cloud SCM, also known as Oracle Supply Chain & Manufacturing, is a cloud-based SCM software application suite used by companies to build and manage intelligent supply chains. This includes support for procurement, order management, manufacturing, product lifecycle management, maintenance, logistics, and supply chain planning and execution.

Oracle Advertising and Customer Experience (CX) 
Oracle Advertising and Customer Experience (CX) is a cloud-based application suite that includes tools for advertising, marketing, sales, e-commerce, and customer service. The suite also includes:
Oracle CX (with Oracle Sales, Oracle Service, Oracle Marketing, Oracle Commerce)
Oracle Advertising (with Oracle Activation and Oracle MOAT Measurement)

Industry vertical applications 
 ATG / Endeca—also branded as on-premises "Oracle Commerce"
 Oracle Retail
 Micros (Retail and Hospitality, acquired post 2012)
 Primavera
 Agile
 AutoVue (for processing CAD and graphics data)

NetSuite 
NetSuite was a cloud computing company acquired by Oracle in 2016. In 2019, NetSuite moved onto Oracle Cloud. NetSuite is a cloud business software platform.

On-premises applications 
 Oracle E-Business Suite
 Oracle PeopleSoft
 Oracle Siebel CRM
 Oracle JD Edwards EnterpriseOne
 Oracle JD Edwards World
 Endeca
Inquira
Silver Creek
Datanomic
Hyperion
Campus Solutions

Oracle's E-Business Suite (also known as EB-Suite/EBS, eBus or "E-Biz") consists of a collection of enterprise resource planning (ERP), customer relationship management (CRM), human capital management (HCM), and supply-chain management (SCM) computer applications either developed or acquired by Oracle. The software utilizes Oracle's core Oracle relational database management system technology. The E-Business Suite contains several product lines often known by short acronyms.

Significant technologies incorporated into the applications include the Oracle database technologies, (engines for RDBMS, PL/SQL, Java, .NET, HTML and XML), the "technology stack" (Oracle Forms Server, Oracle Reports Server, Apache Web Server, Oracle Discoverer, Jinitiator and Sun's Java). 

It makes the following enterprise applications available as part of Oracle eBusiness Suite:
 Asset Lifecycle Management
 Customer Relationship Management (CRM)
 Enterprise Resource Planning (ERP)
 Human Capital Management (HCM)
 Procurement
 Product Life-cycle Management 
 Supply Chain Management
 Manufacturing

See also 
 CEMLI
 List of acquisitions by Oracle (includes acquisitions which extended Applications portfolio)
Oracle Fusion Applications

References

Further reading 
 Cameron, Melanie. Oracle General Ledger Guide (2009) McGraw-Hill. .
 Cameron, Melanie. Oracle Procure-to-Pay Guide (2009) McGraw-Hill. .

External links 
 Oracle Applications home page

Oracle software
Accounting software
Project management software
Supply chain management
Supply chain software companies